The 1997 Infiniti Open was a men's tennis tournament played on outdoor hard courts at the Los Angeles Tennis Center in Los Angeles, California in the United States that was part of the World Series of the 1997 ATP Tour. It was the 70th edition of the tournament and was held from July 21 through July 27, 1997. Sixth-seeded Jim Courier won the singles title.

Finals

Singles
 Jim Courier defeated  Thomas Enqvist 6–4, 6–4
 It was Courier's 2nd singles title of the year and the 21st of his career.

Doubles
 Sébastien Lareau /  Alex O'Brien defeated  Mahesh Bhupathi /  Rick Leach 7–6, 6–4

References

External links
 ITF tournament edition details

Infiniti Open
Los Angeles Open (tennis)
Infiniti Open
Infiniti Open
Infiniti Open
Infiniti Open